The Arkansas City School District was a school district of Arkansas City, Arkansas. Its territory is now in the McGehee School District.

The district had two schools, Arkansas City Elementary School and Arkansas City High School. The athletic mascot was the river rat.

History
In 2004 the Arkansas Legislature approved a law that forced school districts with fewer than 350 students apiece to consolidate with other districts. On July 1, 2004, the Arkansas City School District and the Delta Special School District were merged into the McGehee district.

References

Further reading
Maps of district:
 Map of Arkansas School Districts pre-July 1, 2004
  (Download)

External links

 Arkansas City Schools (Archive)

Defunct school districts in Arkansas
Education in Desha County, Arkansas
2004 disestablishments in Arkansas
School districts disestablished in 2004